The 2015 Toyota Grand Prix of Long Beach was the 41st annual running of the Toyota Grand Prix of Long Beach and the third race of the 2015 IndyCar Series season. It took place on April 19, 2015, in Long Beach, California on its temporary street circuit. It was won by Scott Dixon for the Chip Ganassi Racing team. Hélio Castroneves took second and Juan Pablo Montoya both of whom race for Team Penske. The top finishing rookie in the race, as in the previous round, was Gabby Chaves, who finished in 16th position.

Report

Qualifying

Race results 

Notes
 Points include 1 point for leading at least 1 lap during a race, an additional 2 points for leading the most race laps, and 1 point for Pole Position.

For the first time since race 2 of the 2011 Firestone Twin 275s, every driver finished the race.

Championship standings after the race

Drivers' Championship standings

 Note: Only the top five positions are included.

References

 Lap Report – Verizon IndyCar Series, April 19, 2015

Long Beach
Grand Prix of Long Beach
Grand Prix of Long Beach
2015 in California